Vierville-sur-Mer (literally Vierville on Sea) is a commune in the Calvados department in  Normandy region in northwestern France.

History

World War II

On 6 June 1944 (D-Day), the U.S. Army's 116th Infantry Regiment of the 29th Infantry Division, along with the 5th Ranger Battalion, and A, B, and C Companies of the 2nd Ranger Battalion landed on Dog Green, Dog White, Dog Red, and Easy Green sectors of Omaha Beach, below Vierville-sur-Mer, starting at 6.30 am.

Population

See also
Communes of the Calvados department

References

External links

 American D-Day: Omaha Beach, Utah Beach & Pointe du Hoc
History on the 101st Airborne division

Communes of Calvados (department)
Calvados communes articles needing translation from French Wikipedia
Populated coastal places in France